Middleton Township is one of the eighteen townships of Columbiana County, Ohio, United States. The 2010 census reported 3,612 people living in the township, 3,375 of whom were in the unincorporated portions.

Geography
Located in the eastern part of the county, it borders the following townships and borough:
Unity Township - north
Darlington Township, Beaver County, Pennsylvania - northeast
South Beaver Township, Beaver County, Pennsylvania - east
Ohioville, Pennsylvania - southeast
St. Clair Township - south
Madison Township - southwest corner
Elkrun Township - west
Fairfield Township - northwest corner

One village, two CDPs, and four unincorporated communities are located in Middleton Township:
The village of Rogers, in the northwest
The census-designated place of Lake Tomahawk, in the center
The census-designated place of Negley, in the northeast
The unincorporated community of Achor, in the east
The unincorporated community of Clarkson, in the southwest
The unincorporated community of East Carmel, in the west
The unincorporated community of Mill Rock, in the north

Name and history

Statewide, the only other Middleton Township is located in Wood County.

The township was among the first organized in the county in 1803.

Government
The township is governed by a three-member board of trustees, who are elected in November of odd-numbered years to a four-year term beginning on the following January 1. Two are elected in the year after the presidential election and one is elected in the year before it. There is also an elected township fiscal officer, who serves a four-year term beginning on April 1 of the year after the election, which is held in November of the year before the presidential election. Vacancies in the fiscal officership or on the board of trustees are filled by the remaining trustees.

Township Trustees
Nancy Micheals, Chairwoman
Gregory A. Lipp, Vice Chairman
Tim Pancake

Fiscal Officer
Robert Chapman

References

External links
County website

Townships in Columbiana County, Ohio
1803 establishments in Ohio
Townships in Ohio